Manasseh or Menashe was, according to the Book of Genesis, the first son of Joseph and Asenath. Asenath was an Egyptian woman whom the Pharaoh gave to Joseph as wife, and the daughter of Potipherah, a priest of On. Manasseh was born in Egypt before the arrival of the children of Israel from Canaan.

Biblical narrative

According to the biblical account in Genesis 41:51, the name Manasseh (given to him by Joseph) means "God has made me forget entirely my troubles and my father's house".

Jacob, Joseph's father, adopted Joseph's two sons, Manasseh and Ephraim, to share in Jacob's inheritance equally with Jacob's own sons. Manasseh is counted as the father of the Israelite Tribe of Manasseh, one of the twelve tribes of Israel. Jacob also blessed Ephraim over his older brother.
 
Manasseh had a son, Asriel, with his wife; and Machir with his Aramean concubine.  and  refer to a son called Jair, who "took all the region of Argob, as far as the border of the Geshurites and the Maachathites, and [who] called Bashan after his own name, Havoth Jair.

Biblical criticism
In the Biblical account, Joseph's other son is Ephraim, and Joseph himself is one of the two children of Rachel and Jacob, the other being Benjamin. Biblical scholars regard it as obvious, from their geographic overlap and their treatment in older passages, that originally Manasseh and Ephraim were considered one tribe - that of Joseph; according to several biblical scholars, Benjamin was also originally part of this single tribe, but the biblical account of Joseph as his father became lost. A number of biblical scholars suspect that the distinction of the Joseph tribes (including Benjamin) is that they were the only Israelites which went to Egypt and returned, while the main Israelite tribes simply emerged as a subculture from the Canaanites and had remained in Canaan throughout. According to this view, the story of Jacob's visit to Laban to obtain a wife originated as a metaphor for this migration, with the property and family which were gained from Laban representing the gains of the Joseph tribes by the time they returned from Egypt; according to textual scholars, the Jahwist version of the Laban narrative only mentions the Joseph tribes, and Rachel, and doesn't mention the other tribal matriarchs at all.

The Book of Chronicles states that Manasseh was married to an Aramean concubine, and that they had two sons, named Asriel and Machir; in the Torah's genealogy of Manasseh's family, which textual scholars ascribe to the earlier priestly source, Asriel instead appears to be the son of Gilead, the son of Machir. Near the end of the book of Genesis, according to some English translations of the Bible (such as the King James Version), Manasseh's grandchildren are described as having been brought up upon Joseph's knees, while other English translations (such as the Revised Version) render the same text as born upon Joseph's knees; the gloss for this passage given by some English translations (such as the New International Version) is that the grandchildren were adopted by Joseph as his own children, at the moment they were born.

Rabbinical interpretations 
In the Torah, the eventual precedence of the tribe of Ephraim is argued to derive from Joseph tricking Jacob, blind and on his deathbed, into blessing Ephraim before Manasseh. The text describing this blessing features a hapax legomenon – the word שכל (sh-k-l) – which classical rabbinical literature has interpreted in esoteric manners; some rabbinical sources connect the term with sekel, meaning mind/wisdom, and view it as indicating that Jacob was entirely aware of who he was actually blessing; other rabbinical sources connect the term with shikkel, viewing it as signifying that Jacob was despoiling Manasseh in favour of Ephraim; yet other rabbinical sources argue that it refers to the power of Jacob to instruct and guide the holy spirit.

The Targum Pseudo-Jonathan argues that Manasseh had been a steward in Joseph's household, and had acted as an interpreter between Joseph and his other brothers; this targum also mentions that Manasseh had unusually large strength.

Herbert Armstrong
British Israelite Herbert W. Armstrong of the Worldwide Church of God (1940s to 1980s), in a book called The United States and Great Britain in Prophecy, claimed the United States was a remnant of the Tribe of Manasseh. British Israelite theories are uniformly rejected by mainstream modern scholarship.

Veneration 
Manasses is venerated in Catholic Church as a saint, whose feast day is 3 November or 19 December.

See also 
Ephraim
Tribe of Ephraim
Tribe of Manasseh

References

External links

Founders of biblical tribes
Joseph (Genesis)
Book of Genesis people
Christian saints in unknown century
Roman Catholic royal saints
Christian royal saints
Saints
Christian saints from the Old Testament
Old Testament people
People of Egyptian descent